Wild Horse Ambush is a 1952 American Western film directed by Fred C. Brannon and written by William Lively. The film stars Michael Chapin, Eilene Janssen, James Bell, Richard Avonde, Roy Barcroft and Julian Rivero. The film was released on April 15, 1952, by Republic Pictures.

Plot

Cast
Michael Chapin as Red White
Eilene Janssen as Judy Dawson
James Bell as Sheriff Tom White
Richard Avonde as Jalisco
Roy Barcroft as Big John Harkins
Julian Rivero as Enrico Espinosa
Movita Castaneda as Lita Espinosa
Drake Smith as Henchman Mace Gary
Scott Lee as Henchman Shorty
Alex Montoya as Pedro
John Daheim as Henchman Turk
Ted Cooper as Spy
Wayne Burson as Henchman Tom

References

External links 
 

1952 films
American Western (genre) films
1952 Western (genre) films
Republic Pictures films
Films directed by Fred C. Brannon
American black-and-white films
1950s English-language films
1950s American films